454th may refer to:

454th Bombardment Wing, inactive United States Air Force unit
454th Flying Training Squadron, inactive United States Air Force unit

See also
454 (number)
454 (disambiguation)
454, the year 454 (CDLIV) of the Julian calendar
454 BC